Gregg Baxter is a sound editor who was nominated at the 66th Academy Awards. He was nominated for the film Cliffhanger, he shared the nomination with Wylie Stateman. This was in Best Sound Editing.

Selected filmography

Little Boy (2015)
Get on Up (2014)
Inglourious Basterds (2009)
Wanted (2008)
Troy (2004)
The Insider (1999)
Speed 2: Cruise Control (1997)
Congo (1995)
Nixon (1995)
Outbreak (1995)
Natural Born Killers (1994)
Speechless (1994)
True Lies (1994)
Alive (1993)
Cliffhanger (1993)
In the Line of Fire (1993)
The Last of the Mohicans (1992)
Curly Sue (1991)
Back to the Future Part II (1989)
Mystic Pizza (1988)

References

External links

Sound editors
Living people
Year of birth missing (living people)